In 1997–98 season in Argentine football River Plate won the Apertura 1997 and Vélez Sársfield won the Clausura 1998.

Torneo Apertura ("Opening" Tournament)

Top Scorers

Torneo Clausura ("Closing" Tournament)

Top Scorers

Relegation

Gimnasia y Tiro de Salta and Deportivo Español were relegated with the worst points averages.

Argentine clubs in international competitions

References

Argentina 1997-1998 by Javier Romiser at rsssf.

 

it:Campionato di calcio argentino 1997-1998
pl:I liga argentyńska w piłce nożnej (1997/1998)